Yao Ping (born March 19, 1993) is a Chinese cross-country cyclist. She placed 24th in the women's cross-country race at the 2016 Summer Olympics.

References

1993 births
Living people
Chinese female cyclists
Olympic cyclists of China
Cyclists at the 2016 Summer Olympics
21st-century Chinese women